Henry Belasyse or Bellasis may refer to:
 Sir Henry Belasyse, 1st Baronet (1555–1624), MP
 Henry Belasyse (1604–1647), MP
 Sir Henry Belasyse (died 1667) (c. 1639–1667), MP
 Henry Belasyse, 2nd Baron Belasyse (died 1691)
 Sir Henry Belasyse (died 1717) (1648–1717), soldier and MP
 Henry Belasyse, 2nd Earl Fauconberg (1742–1802), British politician and peer